Kurumbalaperi is a small village located near Pavoorchatram in Tenkasi Taluk, Tenkasi District, in the Indian state of Tamil Nadu. It is located between Pavoorchatram, Kilapavoor and Melapavoor. People of diverse religious practices live in the area. Kurumbalaperi has a temple called Badhrakali Amman Temple. Its festival is very famous.

Councilor
In 2011 local election S.Rajasekara Pandian MA,M.PEd was elected as the councilor of Kurumbala peri. He was a service-minded man. He has done many things for the welfare of the people.

Education 
Kurumbalaperi has two Tamil primary schools, one middle school, one Tamil medium high school, and one English medium primary school. At Pavoorchatram, two government higher secondary schools are available separately for boys and girls.

Temple
kurumbaleri pathrakali amman temple very famous

Transport 
The village has bus terminals and one railway station (2k distance).

External links 

Villages in Tirunelveli district